William Worth Dickerson (November 29, 1851 – January 31, 1923) was a U.S. Representative from Kentucky.

Born in Sherman, Kentucky, Dickerson attended the public schools and the private academy of New Mexico Lloyd in Crittenden, Kentucky.
He studied law.
He was admitted to the bar in 1872 and commenced practice in Williamstown, Kentucky.
He served as prosecuting attorney of Grant County 1872-1876.
He served as member of the State house of representatives 1885-1887.
He served in the State senate 1887-1891.

Dickerson was elected as a Democrat to the Fifty-first Congress to fill the vacancy caused by the resignation of John G. Carlisle.
He was reelected to the Fifty-second Congress and served from June 21, 1890, to March 3, 1893.
He was an unsuccessful candidate for renomination in 1892.
He resumed the practice of law in Williamstown, Kentucky.
He moved to Cincinnati, Ohio, in 1902 and continued the practice of his profession until his death January 31, 1923.
He remains were cremated and the ashes interred in the City Cemetery, Williamstown, Kentucky.

References

1851 births
1923 deaths
Democratic Party members of the Kentucky House of Representatives
Democratic Party Kentucky state senators
Democratic Party members of the United States House of Representatives from Kentucky
People from Williamstown, Kentucky
Politicians from Cincinnati